Li Su-gil (born 3 July 1964) is a North Korean gymnast. He competed in eight events at the 1980 Summer Olympics.

References

1964 births
Living people
North Korean male artistic gymnasts
Olympic gymnasts of North Korea
Gymnasts at the 1980 Summer Olympics
Place of birth missing (living people)
Asian Games medalists in gymnastics
Gymnasts at the 1982 Asian Games
Asian Games gold medalists for North Korea
Asian Games bronze medalists for North Korea
Medalists at the 1982 Asian Games
20th-century North Korean people